Frank George Covelli (born 2 April 1937 in Paducah, Kentucky) is an American former javelin thrower who competed in the 1964 Summer Olympics and in the 1968 Summer Olympics.  He was the 1964 and 1968 American champion.  Throwing for Arizona State University, he was the 1963 NCAA Champion.  Later he threw for the Pacific Coast Club from Long Beach, California.

References

1937 births
Living people
Sportspeople from Paducah, Kentucky
American male javelin throwers
Olympic track and field athletes of the United States
Athletes (track and field) at the 1964 Summer Olympics
Athletes (track and field) at the 1968 Summer Olympics
Pan American Games medalists in athletics (track and field)
Pan American Games gold medalists for the United States
Track and field athletes from California
Track and field athletes from Kentucky
Track and field athletes from Arizona
Athletes (track and field) at the 1967 Pan American Games
Medalists at the 1967 Pan American Games